Burestenen, or Nolbystenen, listed in Rundata as M 1, is a memorial runestone located in the Swedish province of Medelpad.

Description
Burestenen is located in the Kvissle-Nolby-Prästbolet region near the Ljungan's outlet into the Gulf of Bothnia, south of Sundsvall. The area has a unique concentration of historic and prehistoric artifacts.  Burestenen lies beside the ruins of a manor chapel from the Early Middle Ages. Also in the vicinity is a collection of Viking Age graves and twelve large tumuli from the Swedish Migration Period, of which one is Norrland's largest.

In addition to its runic inscription, it has some crosses marking the Christianization of the 11th century Medelpad. Based on its animal ornamentation, it is classified as being in Ringerike style, runestone style Pr1, dated to c. 1020–1050. The inscription is signed by the runemaster Fartägn.

Inscription
A transliteration of the runic inscription is:

barksuain uk sihuastr uk friþi raistu stain þinsa * aftiʀ buri faþur isin * in farþaihn markaþi

The Old Norse text on the stone translates into English as:

Bergsven and Sigfast and Fride raised this stone in memory of Bure, their father. Fartägn carved it.

See also
Bure kinship
List of runestones
Runic alphabet

References

External links
  Medelpads runstenar
 Photo of runestone - Swedish National Heritage Board

Runestones in Medelpad
11th-century inscriptions